Four Forks is an unincorporated community located in Richland Parish, Louisiana, United States.

References

Unincorporated communities in Richland Parish, Louisiana
Unincorporated communities in Louisiana